Lowrie is a surname. Notable people with the surname include:

Allen Lowrie, West Australian botanist
Raymond Lowrie, English athlete
Charles N. Lowrie, American landscape architect
Dick Lowrie (born 1943), Scottish footballer
Donald Lowrie (d. June 5, 1925), American newspaper writer
George Lowrie (1919–1989), Welsh footballer
Henry Berry Lowrie (c. 1844 – 1847-disappeared 1872), North Carolina outlaw
Jason Lowrie, New Zealand rugby league footballer
Jed Lowrie, infielder for the Oakland Athletics
John Patrick Lowrie, American voice actor
Matthew B. Lowrie (1773–1850), mayor of Pittsburgh, Pennsylvania
Ronnie Lowrie (born 1955), Scottish footballer
Todd Lowrie (born 1983), Australian Rugby League player
Walter Lowrie (politician) (1784–1868), US senator from Pennsylvania
Walter H. Lowrie, chief justice of Pennsylvania's Supreme Court
William Lowrie (1857–1933), Australian agricultural educationist

See also
Lowry (disambiguation)

Patronymic surnames